The 1996 Masters Tournament was the 60th Masters Tournament, held April 11–14 at Augusta National Golf Club in Augusta, Georgia.

Nick Faldo won his third Masters and his sixth and final major title, five strokes ahead of runner-up Greg Norman. Faldo overcame a six-stroke deficit going into the final day as Norman, leader after each of the first three rounds, faltered down the stretch once again at Augusta. The win was the seventh by a European in the previous nine Masters. The first win by an Australian at the Masters came seventeen years later when Adam Scott won in 2013.

In the first round, Norman shot the second-ever 63 at the Masters (Nick Price had the first 63, in the third round in 1986). Opening with six pars, Norman birdied nine of the final twelve holes.

Faldo moved into second place with a 67 on Friday and stayed in second, though six shots behind, with a scrambling par on 18 late Saturday afternoon. The par meant that Faldo would be paired with Norman on Sunday which may have proved critical.

In the final round, Norman maintained a four shot lead through 7 holes, and then proceeded to lose five shots to par over the next five holes. Faldo picked up one birdie in that stretch to assume a two shot lead after Norman's tee shot on 12 found the water for a double-bogey. Any thoughts of Norman winning were dashed when his tee shot on the par three 16th also found the water. Faldo's 67 was the best round of the day while Norman's 78 was one of the worst rounds of the day, together yielding the greatest comeback/collapse in Masters history. In addition it tied the largest lead ever blown in a PGA Tour tournament. This record has yet to be broken.	
	
None of the five amateurs made the cut, including 20-year-old Tiger Woods, in his second Masters. He returned as a professional the next year and won by 12 strokes.

Field
1. Masters champions
Tommy Aaron, Seve Ballesteros, Gay Brewer, Billy Casper, Charles Coody, Fred Couples (9,12), Ben Crenshaw (9,12,13), Nick Faldo (3,9,13), Raymond Floyd (9), Doug Ford, Bernhard Langer, Sandy Lyle, Larry Mize, Jack Nicklaus, Arnold Palmer, Gary Player, Craig Stadler (11,12), Tom Watson (9), Ian Woosnam (9), Fuzzy Zoeller
José María Olazábal (9) withdrew with a foot injury.
George Archer, Jack Burke Jr., Bob Goalby, Ben Hogan, Herman Keiser, Cary Middlecoff, Byron Nelson, Henry Picard, Gene Sarazen, Sam Snead, and Art Wall Jr. did not play.

2. U.S. Open champions (last five years)
Ernie Els (11,12,13), Lee Janzen (9,10,12,13), Tom Kite, Corey Pavin (9,10,12,13), Payne Stewart (12,13)

3. The Open champions (last five years)
Ian Baker-Finch, John Daly (4,12), Tom Lehman (10,12,13), Greg Norman (9,10,12,13), Nick Price (4,10,13)

4. PGA champions (last five years)
Paul Azinger (9), Steve Elkington (9,11,12,13)

5. U.S. Amateur champion and runner-up
Buddy Marucci (a), Tiger Woods (a)

6. The Amateur champion
Gordon Sherry (a)

7. U.S. Amateur Public Links champion
Chris Wollmann (a)

8. U.S. Mid-Amateur champion
Jerry Courville Jr. (a)

9. Top 24 players and ties from the 1995 Masters
David Edwards, Brad Faxon (11), David Frost, David Gilford, Jay Haas (10,11,13), Brian Henninger, Scott Hoch (12,13), John Huston, Hale Irwin, Davis Love III (10,12,13), Phil Mickelson (10,12,13), Colin Montgomerie (11), Kenny Perry (13), Loren Roberts (13), Curtis Strange, Duffy Waldorf (10,12)

10. Top 16 players and ties from the 1995 U.S. Open
Brad Bryant (12,13), Bill Glasson, Neal Lancaster, Jeff Maggert (11), Mark McCumber, Frank Nobilo, Mark Roe, Vijay Singh (12,13), Jeff Sluman (11), Steve Stricker, Bob Tway (12,13)

11. Top eight players and ties from 1995 PGA Championship
Bob Estes, Justin Leonard (13), Steve Lowery, Mark O'Meara (12,13)

12. Winners of PGA Tour events since the previous Masters
Woody Austin (13), Mark Brooks, Mark Calcavecchia (13), Ed Dougherty, Fred Funk (13), Jim Furyk, Jim Gallagher Jr. (13), Paul Goydos, Tim Herron, Billy Mayfair (13), Scott McCarron, Paul Stankowski, Hal Sutton, Ted Tryba, D. A. Weibring

13. Top 30 players from the 1995 PGA Tour money list
David Duval, Scott Simpson, Kirk Triplett

14. Special foreign invitation
Michael Campbell, Alex Čejka, Satoshi Higashi, Masashi Ozaki, Costantino Rocca, Sam Torrance

Round summaries

First round
Thursday, April 11, 1996

Source:

Scorecard
First round

Source:

Second round
Friday, April 12, 1996

Source:

Amateurs: Woods (+6), Sherry (+11), Wollmann (+14), Courville, Jr. (+16), Marucci (+16)

Third round
Saturday, April 13, 1996

Final round
Sunday, April 14, 1996

Final leaderboard

Sources:

Scorecard

Cumulative tournament scores, relative to par

References

External links
Masters.com – Past winners and results
Augusta.com – 1996 Masters leaderboard

1996
1996 in golf
1996 in American sports
1996 in sports in Georgia (U.S. state)
April 1996 sports events in the United States